The LFG Stralsund V 19 Putbus was a submarine-borne floatplane scout designed and built by LFG Roland in the latter stages of  World War I.

Design
The V 19 Putbus was a single-seat long-wing monoplane made from aluminum. The fuselage was tube-shaped, made from flat wrapped duraluminum, and the fuel was stored in the wings, which had automatic shut-off valves that allowed the wings to be removed without draining the fuel tanks.

Developmental history
The LFG Stralsund V 19 Putbus was completed in September 1918 and conducted flight tests on behalf of the Imperial German Navy until the Armistice. Three production V 19s were ordered, but none were built by the time the Armistice was signed in November 1918. Interestingly, the Putbus was spared from demolition and scrapping under the terms of the Inter-Allied Disarmament Commission and continued to fly until 1923, when it was eventually scrapped after failing to find a commercial role.

Specifications

References

Further reading
 

Floatplanes